Bassogigas is a genus of cusk eel from the subfamily Neobythitinae, part of the family Ophidiidae. The generic name "Bassogigas" comes from a combination of two Latin words: bassus, which means "deep"  and gigas which means "giant". The species are found in the Indo-Pacific and western Atlantic Ocean.

Species
The following two species are contained within the genus Bassogigas: 
 Bassogigas gillii Goode & Bean, 1896
 Bassogigas walkeri Nielsen & Møller, 2011 – (Walker's cusk eel)

References

Ophidiidae
Marine fish genera
Ray-finned fish genera
Taxa named by Tarleton Hoffman Bean
Taxa named by George Brown Goode